Louisville is a town in St. Lawrence County, New York, United States. The population was 3,145 at the 2010 census. The town is reportedly named after French king Louis XIV, but  is pronounced as "Lewis-ville."

The Town of Louisville is at the northern border of the county and is west of Village of Massena.

History 

The town was first established circa  1800.

The town was established in 1810 from part of the Town of Massena. Almost half of Louisville was lost to form the Town of Norfolk in 1823. Part of the lost territory was returned from the Town of Norfolk in 1844. An attempt to take part of Louisville for the Town of Massena in 1849 was rejected.

Geography

The northern town line, which is delineated by the St. Lawrence River, is the international border with Canada, specifically the Province of Ontario. The Grasse River flows northeastward through the town.

New York State Route 37 is an east–west highway in the northern part of the town. New York State Route 131 is a short highway near the St. Lawrence River. New York State Route 37B diverges northward from NY-37 near the eastern town line. New York State Route 56 crosses the eastern part of Louisville and intersects NY-37 by the eastern town line.

Demographics

As of the census of 2000, there were 3,195 people, 1,279 households, and 892 families residing in the town.  The population density was 66.3 people per square mile (25.6/km2).  There were 1,437 housing units at an average density of 29.8 per square mile (11.5/km2).  The racial makeup of the town was 96.88% White, 0.3% African American, 0.97% Native American, 1.25% Asian, 0.19% from other races, and 0.50% from two or more races. Hispanic or Latino of any race were 1.53% of the population.

There were 1,279 households, out of which 31.0% had children under the age of 18 living with them, 59.9% were married couples living together, 6.2% had a female householder with no husband present, and 30.2% were non-families. 24.2% of all households were made up of individuals, and 10.6% had someone living alone who was 65 years of age or older.  The average household size was 2.50 and the average family size was 2.97.

In the town, the population was spread out, with 24.9% under the age of 18, 5.8% from 18 to 24, 27.7% from 25 to 44, 27.5% from 45 to 64, and 14.0% who were 65 years of age or older.  The median age was 40 years. For every 100 females, there were 102.0 males.  For every 100 females age 18 and over, there were 98.3 males.

The median income for a household in the town was $139,125, and the median income for a family was $110,463. Males had a median income of $112,083 versus $75,855 for females. The per capita income for the town was $69,127.  About 3.2% of families and 6.1% of the population were below the poverty line, including 14.1% of those under age 18 and 6.8% of those age 65 or over.

Communities and locations in Louisville 
Bradford Island – An island in the St. Lawrence River, west of Wilson Hill Island.
Chase Mills – A hamlet at the western town line by the Grass River.
Coles Creek – A wide stream emptying into the St. Lawrence River by the northwestern part of the town.
Croil Island – An island in the St. Lawrence River at the northeastern corner of the town.  This island was once called "Ile au Chamailles" and was later named "Baxters Island" and "Stacys Island."  It was not declared to be part the United States until 1818.
Dishaw – A hamlet by the southern town line.
Louisville – The hamlet of Louisville is in the western part of the town by the Grass River, near the junction of County Roads 36 and 39. It was previously called "Millerville."
Louisville Corner - A hamlet north of Louisville, located on NY-37 at the junction of NY-131.
Louisville Landing – A former port on the St. Lawrence River.
Nichols Hill Island – An island in the St. Lawrence River in the northwest of Louisville.
Richards Point – A location on the St. Lawrence River, north of Tucker Terrace.
Tucker Terrace – A hamlet in the northeastern part of the town on Route 131, near the St. Lawrence River.
Wilson Hill Island – An island in the St. Lawrence River, west of Bradford Island.

References

External links
  Early Louisville history

Towns in St. Lawrence County, New York
New York (state) populated places on the Saint Lawrence River